Dinara Safina and Galina Voskoboeva were the defending champions, but both players chose not to participate.
Chang Kai-chen and Chuang Chia-jung won the title after defeating Chan Hao-ching and Rika Fujiwara 7–5, 6–4 in the final.

Seeds

Draw

Draw

References
 Main Draw

Malaysian Open - Doubles
2012 Doubles